The 1975 Australian Professional Championship was a professional non-ranking snooker tournament, which took place in August 1975.

Eddie Charlton won the tournament defeating Dennis Wheelwright 31–10 in the final.

Main draw

References

Australian Professional Championship
1975 in snooker
1975 in Australian sport